Patrice Martell (born 10 February 1961) is a Mexican alpine skier. He competed in two events at the 1988 Winter Olympics.

References

1961 births
Living people
Mexican male alpine skiers
Olympic alpine skiers of Mexico
Alpine skiers at the 1988 Winter Olympics
Place of birth missing (living people)